What'z Up? is an entertainment magazine show dealing with teen issues.

The show was originally broadcast in the United States in 1994. It was hosted by R. J. Williams and co-hosted by Bianca Lawson, Christopher Masterson and Katie Barnhill. The show was produced by Willie Barnett and co-executive produced by George Zaloom and Les Mayfield in association with their production company ZM Productions.

References

External links
 

1994 American television series debuts
1994 American television series endings
Entertainment news shows in the United States
English-language television shows